Rob Jacobs (born 15 October 1943) is a Dutch former association football player and manager.

A right-back, played for Feijenoord, Xerxes DHC and SBV Excelsior.

He coached SBV Excelsior, FC Groningen, Roda JC, Feyenoord, P.A.O.K., Sparta Rotterdam, Panachaiki and FC Eindhoven.

References

1943 births
Living people
Footballers from Rotterdam
Association football fullbacks
Dutch footballers
Feyenoord players
Excelsior Rotterdam players
XerxesDZB players
Eredivisie players
Eredivisie managers
Dutch football managers
Excelsior Rotterdam managers
FC Groningen managers
Roda JC Kerkrade managers
Feyenoord managers
PAOK FC managers
Sparta Rotterdam managers
Panachaiki F.C. managers
FC Eindhoven managers
Dutch expatriate football managers